Parc des Sports Aguiléra is a multi-purpose stadium in Biarritz, France. The stadium is able to hold 15,000 people. It is currently used mostly for rugby union matches and is the home stadium of Biarritz Olympique.

References

Biarritz Olympique
Rugby union stadiums in France
Sports venues in Pyrénées-Atlantiques
Sport in Biarritz
Sports venues completed in 1906
1906 establishments in France